Dyerophytum socotranum is a small shrub growing up to 2m tall, rather glaucous and covered in white mealy powder.  It has yellow flowers.

Habitat
Dyerophytum socotranum is endemic to Socotra (Yemen).  It lives in dry habitats on limestone cliffs, boulders and wadis up to an altitude of 30–650m.

Uses
The mineral coating on the Dyerophytum socotranum was an important saline browse for livestock, especially the camels of the mountains and plains areas as well as providing a substitute for salt used during cooking.

The dried stem of the plant was also sliced into thin shavings and smoked as a tobacco, usually for medicinal reasons to treat chest conditions and breathing difficulties.

The older, tougher stems were also traditionally used in Dhofar for building bird traps, used mainly to capture partridges.  The birds were attracted to the traps by the bait of scattered grain.

References

Plumbaginaceae
Endemic flora of Socotra